Duggirala railway station (station code:DIG), is an Indian Railways station in Duggirala of Guntur district in Andhra Pradesh. It lies on the Howrah–Chennai main line and is administered under Vijayawada railway division of South Coast Railway zone.

Classification 
In terms of earnings and outward passengers handled, Duggirala is categorized as a Non-Suburban Grade-6 (NSG-6) railway station. Based on the re–categorization of Indian Railway stations for the period of 2017–18 and 2022–23, an NSG–6 category station earns nearly  crore and handles close to  passengers.

References 

Railway stations in Guntur district
Vijayawada railway division